Vera Baker Williams (January 28, 1927 – October 16, 2015) was an American children's writer and illustrator. Her best known work, A Chair for My Mother, has won multiple awards and was featured on the children's television show Reading Rainbow. For her lifetime contribution as a children's illustrator she was U.S. nominee in 2004 for the biennial, international Hans Christian Andersen Award, the highest recognition available to creators of children's books. Additionally, she was awarded the 2009 NSK Neustadt Prize for Children's Literature.

Biography

Early life and education

Vera Baker was born January 28, 1927, in Hollywood, California. She has one sister, Naomi. As a child, her family moved to the Bronx, New York, where her father was frequently absent during her early childhood. In New York City, she danced, acted, and painted at the Bronx House, a local community center. Her book Scooter, published in 1993, is based on her childhood in the Bronx. Encouraged by their parents to explore the arts, she studied at The High School of Music & Art and Black Mountain College in North Carolina, where she received her BFA in Graphic Art in 1949.

Marriage and children

While at Black Mountain College, she married fellow student Paul Williams. The couple divorced in 1970. Together they had three children:
Sarah Williams
Jennifer Williams
Merce Williams

She has five grandchildren:
Hudson Williams
August Williams
William Babcock
Rebecca Babcock
Clare Babcock

Career

Williams was a co-founder of the Gate Hill Cooperative Community and served as a teacher for the community from 1953–70. She taught at alternative schools in New York and Ontario throughout the 1960s and early 1970s. Following her divorce, she emigrated to Canada, where she committed to becoming a children's author and illustrator. In 1975 she was invited by Remy Charlip to illustrate Hooray For Me, which she did while living on a houseboat in Vancouver, British Columbia. She established a publishing relationship with Greenwillow Books that continues to this day. Most recently, Ms. Williams resided in New York City and remained active in local issues such as The House of Elder Artists and participated in the 2007 PEN World Voices literary festival. She died on October 16, 2015.

On May 4, 2019, the Vera's Story Garden at Ethelbert B. Crawford Library in Monticello, New York, was named a United for Libraries Literary Landmark in honor of Vera B. Williams. It was dedicated by the Empire State Center for the Book.

Philosophical and political views

Williams long supported nonviolent and nuclear disarmament causes. She contributed artwork for several covers of Liberation magazine. In 1981 she spent a month in Alderson Federal Prison Camp following arrest at a women's peaceful blockade of the Pentagon. She served on the executive committee of the War Resisters League from 1984 to 1987.

Works

As author
It's a Gingerbread House (1978)
The Great Watermelon Birthday (1980)
Three Days on a River in a Red Canoe (1981)
A Chair for My Mother (1982)
Something Special for Me (1983)
Music, Music for Everyone (1984)
My Mother, Leah and George Sand (1986)
Cherries and Cherry Pits (1986)
Stringbean's Trip to the Shining Sea with Jennifer Williams (1988)
"More More More" Said the Baby (1990)
Scooter (1993)
Lucky Song (1997)
Amber Was Brave, Essie Was Smart (2001)
A Chair for Always (2009)
Home at Last with Chris Raschka (2016)

As illustrator
Hooray For Me!, Remy Charlip (1975)
Long Walks and Intimate Talks, Grace Paley (1991)
Home: A Collaboration of Thirty Authors & Illustrators (1996)

Awards
1983: Boston Globe–Horn Book Award, Picture Book category, A Chair for My Mother
1983: Caldecott Medal Honor Book, A Chair for My Mother
1985: Jane Addams Children's Book Award Honor Book, Music, Music for Everyone
1991: Caldecott Honor, "More More More" Said the Baby
1994: Boston Globe–Horn Book Award, Fiction category, Scooter
1995: Library of Congress exhibition, "Family, Friends, and Community: The Art of Vera B. Williams"
1998: Charlotte Zolotow Award, Lucky Song
2002: Jane Addams Honor, Amber Was Brave, Essie Was Smart
2008: Regina Medal of the Catholic Library Association; body of work
2009: NSK Neustadt Prize for Children's Literature

See also

References

External links
 Vera Baker Williams at the Pennsylvania Center for the Book 
 Vera B. Williams at Library of Congress Authorities – with 21 catalog records 
Interview with Vera Williams about reading and books, All About Kids! TV Series No. 192 (1994) 

1927 births
American children's writers
American women illustrators
American children's book illustrators
Black Mountain College alumni
2015 deaths
People from Hollywood, Los Angeles
The High School of Music & Art alumni
Writers from California
21st-century American women